Council of States may refer to:

 Rajya Sabha (Council of States), the upper house of the Parliament of India
 Council of States (South Sudan), established in 2011 by interim constitution – one of two chambers that compose the National Legislature of South Sudan
 Council of States (Sudan)
 Council of States (Switzerland)

See also 
 Council of State